Brauen is a surname. Notable people with the surname include:

 Martin Brauen (born 1948), Swiss ethnologist
 Sonam Dolma Brauen (born 1953), Tibetan-Swiss painter and sculptor
 Yangzom Brauen (born 1980), Tibetan-Swiss actress, writer and director

German-language surnames